Richard Harris was an American baseball infielder in the Negro leagues. He played with the Philadelphia Stars and Baltimore Black Sox in 1934.

References

External links
 and Seamheads

Baltimore Black Sox players
Philadelphia Stars players
Year of birth unknown
Year of death unknown
Baseball infielders